Catànies (singular: catània) is a chocolate sweet typical of Vilafranca del Penedès and some other near towns  made with marcona almonds. They are toasted and covered first by caramel and then by a thick layer of white chocolate or a mixture of almond, hazelnut and milk. Finally, they are covered by a thin layer of powdered black chocolate, sometimes mixed with a little bit of icing sugar. They are often offered as a gift or served alongside coffee after a meal.

See also
Catalan cuisine

References

Catalan cuisine
Spanish confectionery
Almonds
Chocolate confectionery